A mendiant is a traditional French confection composed of a chocolate disk studded with nuts and dried fruits representing the four mendicant or monastic orders. Each of the ingredients used refers to the color of monastic robes. Tradition dictates that raisins stand for the Augustinians, hazelnut for the Carmelites, dried fig for the Franciscans, and almond for the Dominicans.

Usually produced during Christmas, recipes for this confection have veered away from the traditional combination of nuts and fruits to incorporate seeds, fruit peels, and other items.

References 

Chocolate desserts
Christmas food
Confectionery
French confectionery
French desserts
Raisins
Fig dishes
Almond dishes
Hazelnuts